The Argentina men's national tennis team represents Argentina in Davis Cup tennis competition and is governed by the Asociación Argentina de Tenis. As of 2016, the team has competed in the World Group since 2002 and reached the finals five times (1981, 2006, 2008, 2011 and 2016), winning the cup for the first time in the 2016 edition by defeating Croatia in the final. Argentina is currently #15 in the ITF Davis Cup rankings.

History

Argentina's Davis Cup debut in 1921 started on the wrong foot with a walkover loss to Denmark in the first round. They played their first Davis Cup matches in 1923, losing 1–4 in the first round against Switzerland. After several years of toiling in the regional and preliminary rounds, led by Guillermo Vilas and José Luis Clerc, Argentina reached their first finals in 1981, losing to the United States. After avoiding relegation from the World Group the next year, Argentina reached the semifinals in 1983, losing in Stockholm against the Swedish team.

In the subsequent years, Argentina could not repeat that performance and was relegated to the Americas I Group in 1987. Returned in the 1990-92 World Group, that year was relegated to the Americas Zone again and would not return to main competition until the 2002 Davis Cup, reaching the semifinals again in a loss to Russia that included a historical doubles match between Yevgeny Kafelnikov and Marat Safin against David Nalbandian and Lucas Arnold Ker that at 6 hours and 20 minutes is the longest doubles match in recorded history.

Since 2002, Argentina has reached the finals on four occasions in 2006, 2008, 2011 and 2016. They were crowned as champions for the first time after defeating Croatia in the final in 2016. However, the following year they were relegated to the first group of the Americas Zone.

Venues
Argentina played all of their home games at the Buenos Aires Lawn Tennis Club up until 1996. Since then, other venues were used, not only in Buenos Aires, but also in other cities such as Córdoba, Mendoza and Mar del Plata, the city of choice for the 2008 Finals, the only series of this kind Argentina has hosted so far and also their only home series that was not played on clay. Since 2006, Argentina began to play their home matches at the Mary Terán de Weiss Stadium in Buenos Aires.

Current squad

Rankings as of 20 september 2021

Recent callups

Davis Cup wins

Recent performances
Here is the list of all match-ups since 1981, when the competition started being held in the current World Group format.

1980s

1990s

2000s

2010s

References

External links

Davis Cup teams
Davis Cup